The Asia-Pacific Economic Cooperation (APEC  ) is an inter-governmental forum for 21 member economies in the Pacific Rim that promotes free trade throughout the Asia-Pacific region. Following the success of ASEAN's series of post-ministerial conferences launched in the mid-1980s, APEC started in 1989, in response to the growing interdependence of Asia-Pacific economies and the advent of regional trade blocs in other parts of the world; it aimed to establish new markets for agricultural products and raw materials beyond Europe. Headquartered in Singapore, APEC is recognized as one of the highest-level multilateral blocs and oldest forums in the Asia-Pacific region, and exerts a significant global influence.

The heads of government of all APEC members except Taiwan (which is represented by a ministerial-level official under the name Chinese Taipei as economic leader) attend an annual APEC Economic Leaders' Meeting. The location of the meeting rotates annually among the member economies, and a famous tradition, followed for most (but not all) summits, involves the attending leaders dressing in a national costume of the host country. APEC has three official observers: the Association of Southeast Asian Nations Secretariat, the Pacific Economic Cooperation Council and the Pacific Islands Forum Secretariat. APEC's Host Economy of the Year is considered to be invited in the first place for geographical representation to attend G20 meetings following G20 guidelines.

History

The initial inspiration for APEC came when ASEAN's series of post-ministerial conferences, launched in the mid-1980s, had demonstrated the feasibility and value of regular conferences among ministerial-level representatives of both developed and developing economies. By 1996, the post-ministerial conferences had expanded to embrace 12 members (the then six members of ASEAN and its six dialogue partners). The developments led  Australian Prime Minister Bob Hawke to believe in the necessity of region-wide co-operation on economic matters. In January 1989, Bob Hawke called for more effective economic co-operation across the Pacific Rim region. This led to the first meeting of APEC in the Australian capital of Canberra in November, chaired by  Australian Foreign Affairs Minister Gareth Evans. Attended by ministers from twelve countries, the meeting concluded with commitments to hold future annual meetings in Singapore and South Korea. Ten months later, representatives of 12 Asia-Pacific economies met in Canberra, Australia, to establish APEC. The APEC Secretariat, based in Singapore, was established to co-ordinate the activities of the organisation.

During the 1994 meeting in Bogor in Indonesia, APEC leaders adopted the Bogor Goals, which aimed for free and open trade and investment in the Asia-Pacific by 2010 for industrialised economies and by 2020 for developing economies. In 1995, APEC established a business advisory body named the APEC Business Advisory Council (ABAC), composed of three business executives from each member-country.

In April 2001, APEC, in collaboration with five other international organisations (Eurostat,  IEA, OPEC and the  UNSD) launched the Joint Oil Data Exercise, which in 2005 became the Joint Organisations Data Initiative (JODI).

Meeting locations
The location of the annual meeting rotates among the members.

Member economies

Currently, APEC has 21 members. The criterion for membership, however, is that each member must be an independent economic entity, rather than a sovereign state. As a result, APEC uses the term member economies rather than member countries to refer to its members. One result of this criterion is that membership of the forum includes Taiwan (officially the Republic of China, participating under the name "Chinese Taipei") alongside People's Republic of China (see Cross-Strait relations), as well as Hong Kong, which entered APEC as a British colony but it is now a Special Administrative Region of the People's Republic of China. APEC also includes three official observers: ASEAN, the Pacific Islands Forum and the Pacific Economic Cooperation Council.

Leaders

Current leaders

Possible enlargement

India has requested membership in APEC, and received initial support from the United States, Japan, Australia and Papua New Guinea. Officials have decided not to allow India to join for various reasons, including the fact that India does not border the Pacific Ocean, which all current members do. However, India was invited to be an observer for the first time in November 2011.

Bangladesh, Pakistan, Sri Lanka, Macau, Mongolia, Laos, Cambodia, Costa Rica, Colombia, Panama, and Ecuador, are among a dozen other economies that have applied for membership in APEC. Colombia applied for APEC's membership as early as in 1995, but its bid was halted as the organisation stopped accepting new members from 1993 to 1996, and the moratorium was further prolonged to 2007 due to the 1997 Asian Financial Crisis. Guam has also been actively seeking a separate membership, citing the example of Hong Kong, but the request is opposed by the United States, which currently represents Guam.

Business facilitation
As a regional organization, APEC has always played a leading role in the area of reform initiatives in the area of business facilitation. The APEC Trade Facilitation Action Plan (TFAPI) has contributed to a reduction of 6% in the cost of business transactions across the region between 2002 and 2006. According to APEC's projections, the cost of conducting business transactions will be reduced by another 5% between 2007 and 2010. To this end, a new Trade Facilitation Action Plan has been endorsed. According to a 2008 research brief published by the World Bank as part of its Trade Costs and Facilitation Project, increasing transparency in the region's trading system is critical if APEC is to meet its Bogor Goal targets. The APEC Business Travel Card, a travel document for visa-free business travel within the region is one of the concrete measures to facilitate business. In May 2010 Russia joined the scheme, thus completing the circle.

Proposed FTAAP
APEC first formally started discussing the concept of a Free Trade Area of the Asia-Pacific (FTAAP) at its summit in 2006 in Hanoi. However, the proposal for such an area has been around since at least 1966 and Japanese economist 's proposal for a Pacific Free Trade agreement proposal. While it gained little traction, the idea led to the formation of Pacific Trade and Development Conference and then the Pacific Economic Cooperation Council in 1980 and then APEC in 1989.

In the wake of the 2006 summit, economist C. Fred Bergsten advocated a Free Trade Agreement of Asia-Pacific, including the United States amongst the proposed parties to any agreement at that time. His ideas convinced the APEC Business Advisory Council to support this concept. Relatedly, ASEAN and existing free trade agreement (FTA) partners negotiated the Regional Comprehensive Economic Partnership (RCEP), not officially including Russia. The Trans-Pacific Partnership (TPP) without China or Russia involved became the US-promoted trade negotiation in the region. At the APEC summit in Beijing in 2014, the three plans were all in discussion. President Obama hosted a TPP meeting at the US Embassy in Beijing in advance of the APEC gathering.

The proposal for a FTAAP arose due to the lack of progress in the Doha round of World Trade Organization negotiations, and as a way to overcome the "noodle bowl" effect created by overlapping and conflicting elements of the copious free trade agreements – there were approximately 60 free trade agreements in 2007, with an additional 117 in the process of negotiation in Southeast Asia and the Asia-Pacific region. In 2012, ASEAN+6 countries alone had 339 free trade agreements – many of which were bilateral.

The FTAAP is more ambitious in scope than the Doha round, which limits itself to reducing trade restrictions. The FTAAP would create a free trade zone that would considerably expand commerce and economic growth in the region. The economic expansion and growth in trade could exceed the expectations of other regional free trade areas such as the ASEAN Plus Three (ASEAN + China, South Korea and Japan). Some criticisms include that the diversion of trade within APEC members would create trade imbalances, market conflicts and complications with nations of other regions. The development of the FTAAP is expected to take many years, involving essential studies, evaluations and negotiations between member economies. It is also affected by the absence of political will and popular agitations and lobbying against free trade in domestic politics.

At the 2014 APEC summit in Beijing, APEC leaders agreed to launch "a collective strategic study" on the FTAAP and instruct officials to undertake the study, consult stakeholders and report the result by the end of 2016. APEC Executive Director Alan Bollard revealed in the Elite Talk show that FTAAP will be APEC's big goal out into the future.

The Trans-Pacific Partnership included 12 of the 21 APEC members and had provisions for the accession of other APEC members, five of which expressed interest in membership.

APEC Study Centre Consortium
In 1993, APEC Leaders decided to establish a network of APEC Study Centres (APCs) among universities and research institutions in member economies. The purpose is to foster cooperation among tertiary and research institutes of member economies, thus having better academic collaboration on key regional economic challenges. To encourage independence from the APEC conference, the APCs are funded independently and choose their own research topics.

As of December 2018, there are 70 APCs among the member economies. An annual conference is usually held in the host economy for that year.

APEC Business Advisory Council
The APEC Business Advisory Council (ABAC) was created by the APEC Economic Leaders in November 1995 with the aim of providing advice to the APEC Economic Leaders on ways to achieve the Bogor Goals and other specific business sector priorities, and to provide the business perspective on specific areas of co-operation.

Each economy nominates up to three members from the private sector to ABAC. These business leaders represent a wide range of industry sectors. ABAC provides an annual report to APEC Economic Leaders containing recommendations to improve the business and investment environment in the Asia-Pacific region, and outlining business views about priority regional issues. ABAC is also the only non-governmental organisation that is on the official agenda of the APEC Economic Leader's Meeting.

Annual APEC economic leaders' meetings
Since its formation in 1989, APEC has held annual meetings with representatives from all member economies. The first four annual meetings were attended by ministerial-level officials. Beginning in 1993, the annual meetings are named APEC Economic Leaders' Meetings and are attended by the heads of government from all member economies except Taiwan, which is represented by a ministerial-level official. Despite a similar nature, the annual Leaders' Meetings are not called summits.

Meeting developments
In 1997, the APEC meeting was held in Vancouver. Controversy arose after officers of the Royal Canadian Mounted Police used pepper spray against protesters. The protesters objected to the presence of autocratic leaders such as Indonesian president Suharto.

At the 2001 Leaders' Meeting in Shanghai, APEC leaders pushed for a new round of trade negotiations and support for a program of trade capacity-building assistance, leading to the launch of the Doha Development Agenda a few weeks later. The meeting also endorsed the Shanghai Accord proposed by the United States, emphasising the implementation of open markets, structural reform, and capacity building. As part of the accord, the meeting committed to develop and implement APEC transparency standards, reduce trade transaction costs in the Asia-Pacific region by 5 percent over 5 years, and pursue trade liberalisation policies relating to information technology goods and services.

In 2003, Jemaah Islamiah leader Riduan Isamuddin had planned to attack the APEC Leaders Meeting to be held in Bangkok in October. He was captured in the city of Ayutthaya, Thailand by Thai police on 11 August 2003, before he could finish planning the attack.

Chile became the first South American nation to host the Leaders' Meeting in 2004. The agenda of that year was focused on terrorism and commerce, small and medium enterprise development, and contemplation of free agreements and regional trade agreements.

The 2005 Leaders' Meeting was held in Busan, South Korea. The meeting focused on the Doha round of World Trade Organization (WTO) negotiations, leading up to the WTO Ministerial Conference of 2005 held in Hong Kong in December. Weeks earlier, trade negotiations in Paris were held between several WTO members, including the United States and the European Union, centred on reducing agricultural trade barriers. APEC leaders at the summit urged the European Union to agree to reduce farm subsidies. In a continuation of the climate information sharing initiative established by the APEC Climate Network working group, it was decided by the leaders to install the APEC Climate Center in Busan. Peaceful protests against APEC were staged in Busan, but the meeting schedule was not affected.

At the Leaders' Meeting held on 19 November 2006 in Hanoi, APEC leaders called for a new start to global free-trade negotiations while condemning terrorism and other threats to security. APEC also criticised North Korea for conducting a nuclear test and a missile test launch that year, urging the country to take "concrete and effective" steps toward nuclear disarmament. Concerns about nuclear proliferation in the region was discussed in addition to economic topics. The United States and Russia signed an agreement as part of Russia's bid to join the World Trade Organization.

The APEC Australia 2007 Leaders' Meeting was held in Sydney from 2–9 September 2007. The political leaders agreed to an "aspirational goal" of a 25% reduction of energy intensity correlative with economic development. Extreme security measures including airborne sharpshooters and extensive steel-and-concrete barricades were deployed against anticipated protesters and potential terrorists. However, protest activities were peaceful and the security envelope was penetrated with ease by a spoof diplomatic motorcade manned by members of the Australian television program The Chaser, one of whom was dressed to resemble the Al-Qaeda leader Osama bin Laden.

The APEC Chile 2019, originally to be held 16–17 November 2019 in Chile, was cancelled due to ongoing protests by sections of its population over inequality, the cost of living and police repression.

APEC leaders' group photo
At the end of the APEC Economic Leaders' Meeting, the leaders gather for the official APEC Leaders' Family Photo. A tradition has the leaders dressing to reflect the culture of the host member. The tradition dates to the first such meeting in 1993 when then-U.S. President Bill Clinton insisted on informal attire and gave the leaders leather bomber jackets. At the 2010 meeting, Japan had the leaders dress in smart casual rather than the traditional kimono. Similarly, when Honolulu was selected in 2009 as the site for the 2011 APEC meeting, U.S. President Barack Obama joked that he looked forward to seeing the leaders dressed in "flowered shirts and grass skirts". After viewing previous photos, and concerned that having the leaders dress in aloha shirts might give the wrong impression during a period of economic austerity, Obama instead decided it might be time to end the tradition. Leaders were given a specially designed aloha shirt as a gift but were not expected to wear it for the photo. Leaders in Bali, Indonesia at the 2013 conference wore a batik outfit; in China 2014 Tang suit jackets; in the Philippines 2015 Barong Tagalogs; in Peru 2016 vicuña wool shawls; in 2017 Vietnamese silk shirts.

APEC Summits
  APEC Australia 1989 
  APEC Singapore 1990
  APEC South Korea 1991
  APEC Thailand 1992
  APEC United States 1993
  APEC Indonesia 1994
  APEC Japan 1995
  APEC Philippines 1996
  APEC Canada 1997
  APEC Malaysia 1998
  APEC New Zealand 1999
  APEC Brunei 2000
  APEC China 2001
  APEC Mexico 2002
  APEC Thailand 2003
  APEC Chile 2004
  APEC South Korea 2005
  APEC Vietnam 2006
  APEC Australia 2007
  APEC Peru 2008
  APEC Singapore 2009
  APEC Japan 2010
  APEC United States 2011
  APEC Russia 2012
  APEC Indonesia 2013
  APEC China 2014
  APEC Philippines 2015
  APEC Peru 2016
  APEC Vietnam 2017
  APEC Papua New Guinea 2018
  APEC Chile 2019
  APEC Malaysia 2020
  APEC New Zealand 2021
  APEC Thailand 2022
  APEC USA 2023

Criticism
APEC has been criticised for promoting free trade agreements that would impose restrictions on national and local laws, which regulate and ensure labour rights, environmental protection and safe and affordable access to medicine. According to the organisation, it is "the premier forum for facilitating economic growth, cooperation, trade and investment in the Asia-Pacific region" established to "further enhance economic growth and prosperity for the region and to strengthen the Asia-Pacific community". The effectiveness and fairness of its role has been questioned, especially from the viewpoints of European countries that cannot take part in APEC and Pacific Island nations that cannot participate but stand to be affected by its decisions.

See also 
 Anti-corruption
 ASEAN Free Trade Area
 Asia-Europe Meeting
 Asia-Pacific Trade Agreements Database
 East Asia Economic Caucus
 East Asia Summit
 List of country groupings
 List of multilateral free-trade agreements
 Pacific Alliance
 Pacific Economic Cooperation Council
 University Mobility in Asia and the Pacific

 Other organisations of coastal states
 Bay of Bengal Initiative
 Black Sea Economic Cooperation
 Indian Ocean Rim Association for Regional Cooperation
 Union for the Mediterranean

Notes

References

Further reading

External links

 Asia-Pacific Economic Cooperation
 Congressional Research Service (CRS) Reports regarding APEC

 
International economic organizations
International political organizations
International trade organizations
International organizations based in Asia
International organizations based in Oceania
International organizations based in the Americas
Organizations based in North America
Organizations based in South America
Asia-Pacific
Trade blocs
Business organisations based in Singapore
International organisations based in Singapore
Organizations established in 1989
1989 establishments in Asia
1989 establishments in Oceania
1989 establishments in North America
1989 establishments in South America
Articles containing video clips